Italian International School "Enrico Mattei" (IIS) or the Italian School Lagos is an Italian international school in Lekki Phase I, Lagos, Nigeria. It serves preschool, primary school, lower secondary school, and liceo (upper secondary school).

History
The original Italian education in Lagos began in the 1960s. The school organisation acquired the site for its campus in February 1988. The classroom and office space, built by Italian companies, were completed in January 1991. The athletic facilities opened in May 1992.

Campus
The three story classroom building has air conditioned classrooms, a library, offices, a science laboratory, a computer room, and a music room. The campus also includes a  air conditioned gymnasium, a football (soccer) field, a playground, a swimming pool, and two tennis courts.
it is situated close to  famous 3invest co-working space

References

External links

  Italian International School "Enrico Mattei"

Lekki
International schools in Lagos
Italian international schools in Africa